Fahmaan Khan (born 4 September 1990) is an Indian actor and model who predominantly works in Hindi television. He is best known for playing Dr. Veerpratap Singh Rajawat in Zee TV's drama Apna Time Bhi Aayega (2020-21) and Aryan Singh Rathore in StarPlus's drama romance Imlie (2021-22).

Career 
He started his career first as a model and worked with various brands. For more than nine years, he acted in theatre plays before landing in a short film titled Ver Joints in 2014. His small screen career started with a cameo role in Yeh Vaada Raha in 2015 and then a cameo role in the TV Serial Kundali Bhagya in 2017. 

From 2017 to 2020, Khan was seen in recurring roles in Kya Qusoor Hai Amala Ka, Ishq Mein Marjawan and Mere Dad Ki Dulhan. Since 2020, he is seen playing lead roles in Apna Time Bhi Aayega, Imlie and Pyar Ke Saat Vachan Dharampatnii. 

In 2022, he made his directorial debut with music video Ishq Ho Gaya sung by Tabish Pasha starring himself alongside Sumbul Touqeer Khan.

Filmography

Television

Special appearances

Web series

Music videos

Awards and nominations

See also 
 List of Indian television actors

References

External links
 

1990 births
Living people
Indian male television actors
Male actors in Hindi television
Indian male soap opera actors
21st-century Indian male actors